Pseudopostega mignonae is a moth of the family Opostegidae. It was described by Donald R. Davis and Jonas R. Stonis, 2007. It is known from Cuba and Jamaica.

The length of the forewings is 3.8–4.3 mm. Adults have been recorded in April and June.

Etymology
This species is named in honor of the senior author’s wife, Mignon Marie Davis, who helped to collect the type series and who has assisted him with nearly all his fieldwork for more than 30 years.

References

Opostegidae
Moths described in 2007